This is a list of the world's largest United Kingdom–based law firms by revenue in 2021.

This list excludes firms with a large presence in the U.K. that structure their operations as a Swiss Verein. This is because these firms structurally differ from the firms listed above, especially when it comes to sharing profits. Some of these firms include DLA Piper, Baker McKenzie, Dentons, Norton Rose Fulbright and Squire Patton Boggs among others.

See also
List of largest law firms by profits per partner
List of largest law firms by revenue
List of largest United States-based law firms by profits per partner
List of largest Canada-based law firms by revenue
List of largest Europe-based law firms by revenue
List of largest Japan-based law firms by head count
List of largest China-based law firms by revenue

References

Solicitors
United Kingdom
Law firms
Law firms